The 2011 Copa Sevilla was a professional tennis tournament played on clay courts. It was the 14th edition of the tournament which was part of the 2011 ATP Challenger Tour. It took place in Sevilla, Spain between 5 and 10 September 2011.

ATP entrants

Seeds

 1 Rankings are as of August 29, 2011.

Other entrants
The following players received wildcards into the singles main draw:
  Roberto Carballes
  Ricardo Ojeda Lara
  Pere Riba
  Ismael Rodríguez-Ramos

The following players received entry from the qualifying draw:
  Pablo Martín-Adalia
  Pedro Sousa
  Guillermo Olaso
  Michal Schmid

Champions

Singles

 Daniel Gimeno Traver def.  Rubén Ramírez Hidalgo, 6–3, 6–3

Doubles

 Daniel Muñoz de la Nava /  Rubén Ramírez Hidalgo def.  Gerard Granollers /  Adrián Menéndez, 6–4, 6–7(4–7), [13–11]

External links
Official Website
ITF Search
ATP official site